Camp Unirondack is a queer, social-justice and intentional community-centered youth summer camp and conference center that is located in the western foothills of the Adirondack Mountains near Lowville, New York on Haudenosaunee Land.

The camp was founded in 1951 when the New York State Convention of Universalists purchased  of a "forever wild" peninsula on Beaver Lake (a part of the Beaver River flow) near the border of the Adirondack Park. Unirondack is a member of the Council of Unitarian Universalist Camps & Conferences and serves the Saint Lawrence Unitarian Universalist District and the Metro New York City Unitarian Universalist District, as well as bordering regions, including Quebec, Ontario, Pennsylvania and Ohio. Each UU church in the region has a liaison to the Camp Unirondack Board.

Life at Unirondack
Unirondack provides an experience different from most traditional camps due to
 Camper Empowerment: Camper voice at Unirondack is valued to the larger community. Camp leadership and staff listen to camper concerns and will make changes to the camp program and even organization policies based on camper feedback. Previous evidence of this has come in the form of schedule changes, renaming buildings and cabins, staff and camp policies, gender-inclusive housing and bathrooms, and menu changes.
 Campers' freedom in choosing activities: Campers get a lot of choice when it comes to choosing their preferred activities. Campers choose a week-long activity, choose a one-time-only activity each day, and have a daily period of Free Time in which they are free use their time as they will. However, in order to maintain a sense of community, there are also activities that are campwide. This includes morning and evening programs, meals, and campfire.
 Sense of community: Unirondack creates community through sharing music and poetry at campfire, being together at meals, through games and activities. Unirondack staff aim to encourage respect for each individual; this goal is influenced by the camp's Unitarian Universalist background.
 Radical inclusivity: A core tenant of Unirondack is to be radically inclusive and to be reflective of when the camp has failed to meet this goal. Whether it be for racial equality, gender inclusivity, or intersectional feminism, Unirondack values conversation around how to best meet the needs of those who have had their voices historically ignored.

Mission
Unirondack’s mission is to provide an environment that inspires people to explore responsible roles in the web of life through physical, mental, and spiritual challenges. The camp today is Unitarian Universalist (UU) in terms of programming and principles, but campers are not required to be UU, although many are.

To quote the website: "Our programs are designed with the belief that camp experiences are a powerful force or promoting growth in the lives of children and adults. We interact, discuss, create, and play together, making friendships that last a lifetime."

Unirondack as a Queer Organization

Unirondack is a queer-run organization and posits queerness as a center focus of its business. All of Unirondack's year-round staff identify with queerness, and have made creating Unirondack as a welcoming space for all genders, identities, and expressions, inseparable from the organization's identity. Unirondack was among the first summer camps in the country to offer gender-inclusive cabins to their summer campers, and staff have participated in numerous national conferences to speak on the importance of LGBTQ inclusion in the summer camp world. Unirondack has no gender-specific restrooms, offers gender-inclusive cabins for all youth sessions, upholds respect of all individual's pronouns, and offer queer-focused programming for all ages and generations.

Programming
The camp has a sand beach on Beaver Lake, athletic fields, many row boats and canoes, and a combination boathouse/arts and crafts studio. Outdoor recreation, exploration, social events, educational activities, and arts and crafts are a regular part of camp programming.

In the 1950s through the 1970s, summer sessions for different age groups were often organized around liberal educational themes. For example, World Citizenship Camp for middle-schoolers explored cultural programming and relations between many different countries, often employing foreign exchange college students as counselors. Liberal American kids often made their first acquaintances with people from Asia, Africa and Europe during these sessions. Another session was set aside for Liberal Religious Youth of high-school age in the Iroquois Federation, and later also the Mohawk Federation of upstate New York, who organized their own programs each year. One of the founders of Unirondack, Rev. Howard Gilman, was particularly well known for his efforts to bring inner-city youth outdoors to the Adirondacks during this period, where they met multi-ethnic age-group counterparts from less urban environments, and formed lifelong friendships. Many learned to swim, canoe and fish in Beaver Lake, and enjoyed the fellowship of singing around campfires each night, all non-urban experiences.

Although Unirondack today hosts spring and fall sessions as well as work weekends throughout the year, the focus of the camp is the summer sessions.  The summer sessions are named after famous Unitarians or Universalists.  Each is a week long and is for a specific age range of campers:

Barton, for ages 9–12

Channing I & II, for ages 12–14

Parker I & II, for ages 14–16

Ballou I & II, for older 15-18 yr olds

Trip Camp, for ages 15–18

Family Camp for all ages

The camp also organizes week-long backpacking and canoeing trips throughout the summer. UU Congregations in the region may lease the camp for weekend retreats or meetings. or may visit the camp for “work/play weekends,” a low-key way to enjoy the woods and contribute to upkeep of the camp. Attendees spend Saturday morning cleaning and repairing facilities, and the rest of the weekend hiking, canoeing, or otherwise relaxing in the great outdoors.

References

External links

Unirondack
Unitarian Universalism in New York (state)
Buildings and structures in Lewis County, New York